Alliance Airport may refer to:

Alliance Municipal Airport, a municipal airport in Box Butte County, Nebraska, near the city of Alliance.
Perot Field Fort Worth Alliance Airport, the major airport in the Dallas-Fort Worth metroplex